The NIT Season Tip-Off is an annual college basketball tournament that takes place in November of each year, toward the beginning of the season. The first two rounds are held at campus sites, while the semifinals and the finals are held during the week of Thanksgiving in Brooklyn, NY. 2020's tournament was to be held at Amway Center in Orlando, FL, but the COVID-19 pandemic caused the NCAA to cancel it.  The tournament, which is a part of the regular season for all participating colleges, began in 1985 as the Preseason NIT,  so-called in order to distinguish it from the post-season NIT.  In 2005, the NCAA purchased the Men's Preseason and Postseason NIT and renamed the November tournament the NIT Season Tip-Off.  The tournament remains one of the most well-known preseason tournaments in NCAA Division I men's basketball, along with the Maui Invitational.

Tournament Format
The tournament had a new format in 2006. The first two rounds were held at regional "common sites" instead of campus sites, making the format more like the postseason NCAA Tournament. Through 2014, the semifinals and finals had always been held at Madison Square Garden. In 2006, the common sites were Charlotte, North Carolina, Nashville, Tennessee, Indianapolis and Spokane, Washington. The tournament returned to its previous format in 2007 then returned to the 2006 format in 2009.

On September 3, 2014 a new format was announced for the NIT Season Tip-Off. The NIT Season Tip-Off will no longer be a bracketed event, instead becoming a classic with set semifinal matchups in New York, after the NCAA could only get eight teams in the field instead of 16. The NCAA-run event will add a new wrinkle due to the reduced field and feature a showcase of games on Thanksgiving Day with the other four teams that are not in the championship. Teams in the NIT Season Tip-Off will play four games at campus sites prior to the eight teams' arrival in New York.

The NIT Season Tip-Off tournament will not occur in 2022, but it will return in 2023.

Tournament History

Venues
Madison Square Garden hosted the semifinal and final rounds for the first three decades, since the tournament's inception.  Beginning in 2015, Barclays Center in Brooklyn will hold the two semifinal games on Thanksgiving Day, as well as the championship game the following day.  Barclays Center will also have the 2016 and 2018 semis and finals.  In 2017, the tournament is scheduled to move over to the nearby Nassau Veterans Memorial Coliseum, which is in the process of getting a major renovation to its facilities.

Past championship games
1985 – Duke 92, Kansas 86
1986 – UNLV 96, Western Kentucky 95 (2 OT)
1987 – Florida 70, Seton Hall 68
1988 – Syracuse 86, Missouri 84 (OT)
1989 – Kansas 66, St. John's 57
1990 – Arizona 89, Arkansas 77
1991 – Oklahoma State 78, Georgia Tech 71
1992 – Indiana 78, Seton Hall 74
1993 – Kansas 86, Massachusetts 75
1994 – Ohio 84,  80 (OT)
1995 – Arizona 81, Georgetown 71
1996 – Indiana 85, Duke 69
1997 – Kansas 73, Florida State 58
1998 – North Carolina 57, Stanford 49
1999 – Arizona 63, Kentucky 51
2000 – Duke 63, Temple 60
2001 – Syracuse 74, Wake Forest 67
2002 – North Carolina 74, Stanford 57
2003 – Georgia Tech 85, Texas Tech 65
2004 – Wake Forest 63, Arizona 60
2005 – Duke 70, Memphis 67
2006 – Butler 79, Gonzaga 71
2007 – Texas A&M 70, Ohio State 47
2008 – Oklahoma 87, Purdue 82 (OT)
2009 – Duke 68, Connecticut 59
2010 – Tennessee 78, Villanova 68
2011 – Syracuse 69, Stanford 63
2012 – Michigan 71, Kansas State 57
2013 – Arizona 72, Duke 66
2014 – Gonzaga 73, St. John's 66
2015 – Villanova 69, Georgia Tech 52
2016 – Temple 81, West Virginia 77
2017 – Virginia 70, Rhode Island 55
2018 – Kansas 87, Tennessee 81 (OT)
2019 – Oklahoma State 78, Ole Miss 37
2020 – NONE (COVID-19 pandemic).
2021 - Iowa State 78, Memphis 59

Brackets 
* – Denotes overtime period

2021

2020
The field originally included Cincinnati, Arizona, Texas Tech and St. John's.

An initial attempt was made to move the event to the bubble at the ESPN Wide World of Sports Complex in Walt Disney World, but the tournament was eventually cancelled outright due to COVID-19.

2019

2018

2017

Campus Site Games

Championship Round

2016

2015

2014

Thanksgiving Day Games

2013

2012

2011

2010

2009

2008

2007

See also
National Invitation Tournament

External links
Official Site of the NIT Season Tip-Off
Bloomberg.com article discussing purchase of NIT Preseason & Postseason tournaments

References

College men's basketball competitions in the United States
College basketball competitions
Annual sporting events in the United States
Recurring sporting events established in 1985
1985 establishments in New York (state)
Basketball competitions in New York City